Michael Earl Henderson (July 7, 1951 – July 19, 2022) was an American bass guitarist and vocalist. He was known for his work with Miles Davis in the early 1970s and on early fusion albums such as Jack Johnson, Live-Evil, and Agharta, along with a series of his own R&B/soul hits and others featuring him on vocals, particularly the Norman Connors-produced hit "You Are My Starship" in 1976 and other songs in the mid to late-1970s.

Early life 
Michael Earl Henderson was born on July 7, 1951, in Yazoo City, Mississippi. In the early 1960s he moved to Detroit, playing as a session musician.

Career
Henderson was one of the first notable bass guitarists of the fusion era as well as being one of the most influential jazz and soul musicians of the past 40 years. In addition to Davis, he played and recorded with Marvin Gaye, Aretha Franklin, Stevie Wonder, the Dramatics, among many others.

Before working with Davis, Henderson had been touring with Stevie Wonder, whom he met at the Regal Theater in Chicago while warming up for a gig. Davis saw the young Henderson performing at the Copacabana in New York City in early 1970 and reportedly said to Wonder simply "I'm taking your fucking bassist." After almost seven years with Davis, Henderson focused on songwriting and singing in a solo career that produced many hit songs and albums for Buddah Records until his retirement in 1986. Although known primarily for ballads, he was an influential funk player whose riffs and songs have been widely covered. He is also known for his ballad vocalizing on several Norman Connors hit recordings, including "You Are My Starship" and "Valentine Love", performed with Jean Carn.

Personal life and death
At the time of his death, Henderson was in a relationship with DaMia Satterfield, and separated from his wife, Adelia Thompson. He had three children, and lived in the Atlanta suburb of Dallas, Georgia, where he died from cancer on July 19, 2022, aged 71.

Solo discography

Studio albums

Singles

Collaborations

With Miles Davis 

 The Cellar Door Sessions (1970)
 A Tribute to Jack Johnson (1971)
 Live-Evil (1971)
 On the Corner (1972)
 In Concert: Live at Philharmonic Hall (1973)
 Big Fun (1974)
 Get Up with It (1974)
 Agharta (1976)
 Pangaea (1975)
 Dark Magus (1977)
 The Complete Jack Johnson Sessions (Columbia Legacy, 2003)
 The Complete On the Corner Sessions (Columbia Legacy, 2007)
 Miles Davis at Newport 1955–1975: The Bootleg Series Vol. 4 (Columbia Legacy, 2015)

With Stevie Wonder 

 Live at the Talk of the Town (1970)

With The Dramatics 

 Whatcha See Is Whatcha Get (1971)

References

External links 

 
 Funk: United States
 

1951 births
2022 deaths
20th-century African-American male singers
20th-century African-American musicians
20th-century American bass guitarists
20th-century American male musicians
21st-century African-American male singers
21st-century African-American musicians
21st-century American bass guitarists
21st-century American male musicians
African-American guitarists
American blues singers
American funk bass guitarists
American jazz bass guitarists
American male bass guitarists
American male jazz musicians
American male singers
American rhythm and blues bass guitarists
Ballad musicians
Deaths from cancer in Georgia (U.S. state)
Guitarists from Detroit
Guitarists from Mississippi
Jazz musicians from Michigan
Jazz musicians from Mississippi
People from Dallas, Georgia
People from Yazoo City, Mississippi
Singers from Detroit
Singers from Mississippi
The Lucky Strikes members